In 1994 Volkswagen Commercial Vehicles in Europe and Volkswagen of Brazil launched the jointly developed L80 light truck for the European market.

It met the European exhaust and emissions tests of 91/542/EEC Standard to EG/70/157.

Tyres had a dimension of 215/75 x 17.5 which complied German standards of the time. 

The cab was borrowed from the Volkswagen LT series; a different front bumper and headlights it gave the L80 a different appearance.

The L80 was discontinued from sale in Europe in 2000 due to stringent European emission regulations.

L80